The Federation of Regional Organizations of Radio and Television (FORTA) is the association of the public broadcasting networks from 12 autonomous communities of Spain. It was created on 5 April 1989.

Members

Non-members 
Extremadura's CEXMA has not joined the FORTA by self-decision. The corporations of the autonomous cities of Ceuta (RTVCE) and Melilla (TVM) are not part of the FORTA either.
Four autonomous communities (Cantabria, Castile and León, La Rioja and Navarre) lack a public broadcasting network. There are region-wide private broadcasting networks in Cantabria (PopularTV Cantabria), Castile and León (RTVCYL), La Rioja (TVR) and Navarre (NATV).

Former members 
Valencia's regional broadcaster Ràdio Televisió Valenciana (RTVV) became defunct in 2013.

See also
Television in Spain

References

External links
Official FORTA website

 
1989 establishments in Spain
Organizations established in 1989
Television organizations
Non-profit organisations based in Spain
Television in Spain
Radio in Spain